Jasim Mohammed Jaafar is an Iraqi politician who served as Minister for Youth & Sports in Nouri al-Maliki's government. He was elected to the post by the Iraqi National Assembly on 20 May 2006, having previously served as the Minister for Construction and Housing in the Iraqi Transitional Government.

Jaafar was born in 1958 in Tuz Khurmatu, Saladin Governorate to Turkmen parents. He went to university in Sulaymaniyah where he obtained a master's degree in civil engineering. He joined the opposition to Saddam Hussein in 1976 and was sentenced to death in 1981. He went into exile to Iraqi Kurdistan and helped found the Islamic Union of Iraqi Turkoman in 1991, becoming its deputy leader.

References
Beehner, Lionel (May 12, 2005), IRAQ: Cabinet Ministers, Council on Foreign Relations, accessed June 4, 2006.
 
 Ministers, Iraqi Transitional Government, 2005-05-09

1958 births
Living people
People from Saladin Governorate
Iraqi Shia Muslims
Islamic Union of Iraqi Turkoman politicians
Government ministers of Iraq
Iraqi prisoners sentenced to death
Prisoners sentenced to death by Iraq